The 1975 IAAF World Cross Country Championships was held in Rabat, Morocco, at the Souissi Racecourse on March 16, 1975.   A report on the event was given in the Glasgow Herald.

Complete results for men, junior men,  women, medallists, 
 and the results of British athletes were published.

Medallists

Race results

Senior men's race (12 km)

Note: Athletes in parentheses did not score for the team result

Junior men's race (7 km)

Note: Athletes in parentheses did not score for the team result

Senior women's race (4.2 km)

Note: Athletes in parentheses did not score for the team result

Medal table (unofficial)

Note: Totals include both individual and team medals, with medals in the team competition counting as one medal.

Participation
An unofficial count yields the participation of 316 athletes from 26 countries.

 (14)
 (12)
 (21)
 (6)
 (1)
 (18)
 (12)
 (21)
 (6)
 (7)
 (12)
 (20)
 (7)
 (19)
 (14)
 (7)
 (6)
 (6)
 (21)
 (21)
 (7)
 (6)
 (9)
 (18)
 (13)
 (12)

See also
 1975 IAAF World Cross Country Championships – Senior men's race
 1975 IAAF World Cross Country Championships – Junior men's race
 1975 IAAF World Cross Country Championships – Senior women's race
 1975 in athletics (track and field)

References

External links 
GBRathletics

 
World Athletics Cross Country Championships
C
IAAF World Cross Country Championships
International athletics competitions hosted by Morocco
Cross country running in Morocco